Kill Kill Kill is the debut 7-inch EP by Anti-Flag. They had released a couple of splits before this and had appeared on a compilation or two, but this was their first solo release. It was recorded and released "around 1995" and is now long out of print. Most of the songs can be found on their first full-length Die for the Government.

Track listing
 You'd Do the Same
 No More Dead
 Kill the Rich
 Davey Destroyed the Punk Scene

Notes: The versions of "You'd Do The Same", "No More Dead", and "Kill The Rich" on this EP are exactly the same recordings used on Die for the Government, but this version of "Davey Destroyed the Punk Scene" is exclusive to this release.

Personnel
 Justin Sane – vocals, guitar
 Pat Thetic – drums
 Andy Flag – bass, vocals

References

 https://web.archive.org/web/20140412114212/http://www.anti-flag.com/?page_id=46#discography

1995 debut EPs
Anti-Flag albums